The British Society of Russian Philately is a philatelic society dedicated to the study of postage stamps and postal history of Russia and Russian-related countries.

History
The society was founded in 1936 by Dr A H Wortman (7 Sept. 1898 - 15 Jan. 1983) who was its first president. He remained a member of the Executive Committee until he died. Initially the society was known as The Russian Study Circle.

Other presidents have included Dr Raymond Casey, Herbert Roy Chamberlain and George Henderson.

Meetings
Meetings of the society are held five times a year in London and also in several regional areas.

Services
The society offers various services, such as auctions, expertization of stamps, exchange packets, use of the society’s philatelic library, philatelic book reviews, and upcoming show/exhibition listings.

Publications
A regular journal is published.

In 1960, S.D. Tchilinghirian and W.S.E. Stephen won the Crawford Medal of the Royal Philatelic Society London for their work Stamps of the Russian Empire used abroad which was issued in parts over several years.

Organisation
The society is administered by a set of officers, including president, secretary, treasurer, librarian, journal editor, exchange packet secretary, auction secretary, publicity officer, newsletter editor, expertising committee secretary, Russia consultant and representative in North America.

See also
 Postage stamps and postal history of Russia

References

External links
 The British Society of Russian Philately.

Philatelic organisations based in the United Kingdom
1936 establishments in the United Kingdom
Philately of Russia
Russian studies
Organizations established in 1936